Gifford Pinchot National Forest is a National Forest located in southern Washington, managed by the United States Forest Service. With an area of 1.32 million acres (5300 km2), it extends 116 km along the western slopes of Cascade Range from Mount Rainier National Park to the Columbia River. The forest straddles the crest of the South Cascades of Washington State, spread out over broad, old growth forests, high mountain meadows, several glaciers, and numerous volcanic peaks. The forest's highest point is at 12,276 ft. at the top of Mount Adams, the second tallest volcano in the state after Rainier. Often found abbreviated GPNF on maps and in texts, it includes the  Mount St. Helens National Volcanic Monument, established by Congress in 1982.

History

Gifford Pinchot National Forest is one of the older national forests in the United States. Included as part of the Mount Rainier Forest Reserve in 1897,  was set aside as the Columbia National Forest on July 1, 1908.

In 1855, the US government commissioned Washington Territory to negotiate land cession treaties with tribes around the forest. The Yakama tribe signed a treaty agreement that stipulated their moving to a reservation while maintaining off-reservation resource rights; however, the original treaty was then broken in 1916 when the Washington State Supreme Court ruled that Yakamas' hunting off the reservation had to subscribe to state fish and game laws. Many tribes in the area have continued to use the area's resources while encountering non-Native hunters, fishers, and recreation users.

It was later renamed the Gifford Pinchot National Forest on June 15, 1949, in honor of Gifford Pinchot, one of the leading figures in the creation of the national forest system of the United States. His widow and fellow conservationist, Cornelia Bryce Pinchot, was one of the speakers who addressed the audience assembled that day. In 1985 the non-profit Gifford Pinchot Task Force formed to promote conservation of the forest.

Geography

Gifford Pinchot National Forest is located in a mountainous region approximately between Mount St. Helens to the west, Mount Adams to the east, Mount Rainier National Park to the north, and the Columbia River to the south. This region of Southwest Washington is noted for its complex topography and volcanic geology. About 65 percent of the forest acreage is located in Skamania County. In descending order of land area the others are Lewis, Yakima, Cowlitz, and Klickitat. counties.

Major rivers 
The Pacific Northwest brings abundant rainfall to the Gifford Pinchot National Forest, feeding an extensive network of rivers. The forest has only one river currently designated as Wild and Scenic, the White Salmon River, fed from glaciers high on Mount Adams. The Gifford Pinchot National Forest recommends four rivers to be added to the Wild and Scenic System. They are the Lewis River, the Cispus River, the Clear Fork and the Muddy Fork of the Cowlitz River. There are an additional thirteen rivers in the forest being studied for consideration into the national Wild and Scenic River System.

The following listed are the major streams and rivers of the Gifford Pinchot National Forest. Many of these provide excellent fishing. 
 Cispus River
 Cowlitz River
 White Salmon River
 Little White Salmon River
 Wind River
 Lewis River
 Muddy River
 East Canyon Creek
 Skate Creek
 Iron Creek
 Trout Lake Creek
 Cultus Creek
 Quartz Creek
 Butter Creek
 Clear Creek
 Siouxon Creek
 Canyon Creek
 Johnson Creek

Major lakes 
The Gifford Pinchot National Forest includes many popular and secluded backcountry lakes. Most of the lakes offers excellent fishing. Goose Lake is known for the best fishing in the State of Washington.

The following table lists the major lakes of the Gifford Pinchot National Forest:

Congressional action
Congressional action since 1964 has established one national monument and seven wilderness areas in the Gifford Pinchot National Forest.

National Monuments 

On August 26, 1982, congressional action established the Mount St. Helens National Volcanic Monument, after the cataclysmic eruption of Mount St. Helens in 1980.

Wilderness Areas 
Congressional action since 1964 has established the following wilderness areas:
 Glacier View Wilderness – 3,073 acres (12.4 km2)
 Goat Rocks – 108,096 acres (437.4 km2), part of which lies in neighboring Wenatchee NF
 Indian Heaven – 20,782 acres (84.1 km2)
 Mount Adams – 47,078 acres (190.5 km2)
 Tatoosh – 15,725 acres (63.6 km2)
 Trapper Creek – 5,969 acres (24.2 km2)
 William O. Douglas – 169,061 acres (684.2 km2), most of which lies in neighboring Wenatchee NF
 The Shark Rock Wilderness was proposed in the mid-1970s by E.M. Sterling for the 75,000 acre Dark Divide Roadless Area in his book, The South Cascades. It is the largest unprotected roadless area (allowing motorized access) in the Washington Cascades, featuring sharp peaks and deep canyons, old growth forests, and delicate subalpine meadows.

Points of interest 

The forest also offers the following special areas and points of interest: 
 Dark Divide Roadless Area
 Silver Star Scenic Area
 Lava tubes, caves, and casts (notably the Ice Caves)
 Ape Caves
 Midway High Lakes Area
 Big Lava Bed
 Packwood Lake
 Sawtooth Berry Fields, huckleberry fields reserved for Yakima tribe use. Designated in 1932 through a handshake agreement between forest supervisor J.R. Bruckart and Yakima Chief William Yallup.
 Lone Butte Wildlife Emphasis Area
 Layser cave, a dwelling for Native Americans 7000 years ago and a former archeological site.

Forest Service management
 The forest supervisor's office is located in Vancouver, Washington. There are local ranger district offices in Randle, Amboy, and Trout Lake. The forest is named after the first chief of the United States Forest Service, Gifford Pinchot. Washington towns near entrances of the forest include Cougar, Randle, Packwood, Trout Lake, and Carson.

Ecology 

The Gifford Pinchot National Forest is the native habitat for several threatened species which include the spotted owl (threatened 2012) as well as multiple species of Northwest fish like the bull trout (threatened 1998), chinook salmon (threatened 2011), coho salmon (threatened 2011) and steelhead (threatened 2011).

People for over 6,000 years have made an impact in the ecology of the Gifford Pinchot National Forest. Native Americans hunted in high meadows below receding glaciers. The natives then began to manage the forest to meet their own needs. One method they used was to burn specific areas to help in the huckleberry production. About 338 spots more than 6,000 culturally modified trees were identified, of which 3,000 are protected now. Archaeological investigations are supported by the United States Forest Service.

The forest was home to the Big Tree at the southern flank of Mt Adams, one of the world's largest Ponderosa Trees.

See also
 Wind River Arboretum

References

External links 

 Official website
 Gifford Pinchot Task Force

 
Cascade Range
National Forests of Washington (state)
Protected areas of Clark County, Washington
Protected areas of Cowlitz County, Washington
Protected areas of Klickitat County, Washington
Protected areas of Lewis County, Washington
Protected areas of Skamania County, Washington
Protected areas of Yakima County, Washington
Protected areas established in 1908
1908 establishments in Washington (state)